The music of the video game Final Fantasy XIII was composed by Masashi Hamauzu. Former regular series composer Nobuo Uematsu did not contribute any pieces to the soundtrack. Music from the game has been released in several albums. The main soundtrack album, Final Fantasy XIII Original Soundtrack, was released on four Compact Discs in 2010 by Square Enix, the developers and producers of the game. Selections from the soundtrack have been released on two gramophone record albums, W/F: Music from Final Fantasy XIII and W/F: Music from Final Fantasy XIII Gentle Reveries, both in 2010 by Square Enix. An album of arranged pieces from the soundtrack, Final Fantasy XIII Original Soundtrack -PLUS-, was also released by Square Enix in 2010, as was an album of piano arrangements, Piano Collection Final Fantasy XIII. The theme song for the Japanese version of the game, was released as a single by For Life Music in 2009.

The soundtrack received good reviews from critics, who felt that it was Hamauzu's best work to date and an excellent mix of material and genres which took the series' music in a new direction. The "Plus" album received weaker reviews, primarily due to its perceived lack of tracks that were significantly different from those in the original soundtrack album, while "Kimi ga Iru Kara" was considered bland and disappointing. The "Piano" album's reception was split between critics who felt that the tracks did not deviate enough from the original pieces and those who felt that the straightforward arrangements were sophisticated. Music from the game was played at a live orchestral concert in Stockholm, Sweden, and was added to the permanent rotation of the international Distant Worlds concert series, while tracks from the piano album have been played in concerts in Japan and Paris.

Creation and influence

Masashi Hamauzu composed the game's soundtrack. His previous work on the series was as a co-composer for Final Fantasy X and as the main composer for Dirge of Cerberus: Final Fantasy VII. The game was the first main-series Final Fantasy game not to include any compositions by original series composer Nobuo Uematsu; although he was originally announced to compose the main theme of the game, this role was taken over by Hamauzu after Uematsu signed on to compose the soundtrack for Final Fantasy XIV. Game producer Yoshinori Kitase chose Hamauzu because he felt that Hamauzu would be the best for the job as he was composing an orchestral-based soundtrack then for Dirge of Cerberus and the Final Fantasy XIII team wanted that style for the game. Hamauzu described the soundtrack in the liner notes for the soundtrack album as comprising multiple genres of music so that the player would not get tired of it, while also using several motifs so as to tie the varying pieces together; particularly in grouping the themes from the Cocoon and Pulse areas in the game. He tried to match each piece and theme to his sense of the narrative and characters involved in the scenes that they would be played in, and feels that being the sole composer for the project allowed him to ensure that the overall direction of the soundtrack was consistent.

Besides some pieces he did for promotional events in 2006 and 2007, Hamauzu began composing the soundtrack in Autumn 2008 and finished it around one year later. When he began the bulk of the composition, he started by composing the motifs he wanted to use, rather than any particular piece. The first track that he composed was "Blinded by Light", as one of the promotional pieces; it was based on the director Motomu Toriyama's vision of the game as a mixture of fantasy and near-future, as the storyline for the game had not yet been finalized. As the game was intended to be a conscious departure from the staples of previous Final Fantasy games, Hamauzu was not constrained in keeping the music in line with previous soundtracks from the series. Despite this, he did not compose the music specifically to "break from the series' past", but rather focused it on the game as it was presented.

The score features some recordings by the Warsaw Philharmonic Orchestra, arranged by Yoshihisa Hirano, Toshiyuki Oomori and Kunihito Shiina. Hamauzu had previously worked with the orchestra on his album Vielen Dank, released in 2007. Four songs in the soundtrack include vocals by Mina Sakai, an artist whom Hamauzu works as a producer for. Two of the songs are in English rather than Japanese, and "The Gapra Whitewood" was intended to be as well, but during practice Sakai and Hamauzu changed it to use a fictitious language as they felt her focus on pronouncing the English words was detracting from the melody. The two English tracks were re-recorded for the English version of the game, as the localization team felt that they did not sound natural to native speakers. On three of the pieces from the soundtrack: "Sazh's Theme", "Daddy's Got the Blues", and "Can't Catch a Break", described as jazzy pieces related to the character Sazh, Hamauzu's compositions were arranged by Toru Tabei, a friend of his, who Hamauzu describes as being more familiar with that style of music.

The theme song for the international version of the game is "My Hands", from British singer Leona Lewis' second album Echo; it was chosen to replace Final Fantasy XIIIs original theme song from the Japanese version, "Kimi ga Iru Kara" by Sayuri Sugawara. Square Enix President Yoichi Wada has stated that it would have been better if the American branch of the company had produced a theme song from scratch, but the lack of staff led to the decision of licensing an existing song instead. Hamauzu, who composed the music for "Kimi ga Iru Kara", only met Sugawara once, and was not involved in producing the vocal song. He was not involved in the decision to use "My Hands" for the international version.

Soundtrack

Final Fantasy XIII Original Soundtrack is the soundtrack album of Final Fantasy XIII, containing all of the musical tracks from the game, and was composed and produced by Masashi Hamauzu. The soundtrack spans four discs and 85 tracks, covering a duration of 4:04:06. It was released on January 27, 2010 in Japan by Square Enix, bearing the catalog numbers SQEX-10183~6. The limited edition of the soundtrack included a bonus disc containing a radio drama written by novelist Jun Eishima. The radio drama does not include any music not already in the album. The album sold 16,000 copies the day of its release. It reached #3 on the Japanese Oricon charts, and remained on the charts for nine weeks. The soundtrack incorporates both orchestral and electronic music, sometimes within the same track. Almost two dozen of the tracks include vocal performances to some degree, the most of any Final Fantasy soundtrack to date. It does not include many of the mainstay tracks from previous games in the series such as Uematsu's "Prelude" and "Main Theme", and its variation on his "Chocobo", the only repeat track, is so different as to not credit him as the original composer in the album.

In addition to the full soundtrack CD release, two vinyl record albums have been released by Square Enix in 2010, each including a selection of pieces from the full soundtrack. The first of these, W/F: Music from Final Fantasy XIII, was released on February 26, while the second, W/F： Music from Final Fantasy XIII Gentle Reveries, was released on June 30. W/F: Music from Final Fantasy XIII is the first vinyl record that Square Enix has ever released. Each album contains eight tracks, four per side. The first album has a total length of 32:06 and a catalog number of SE-M0001, while the second has the catalog number SE-M0002.

The album received good reviews from critics. Patrick Gann of RPGFan called it an "excellent soundtrack" that exceeded his expectations. He applauded Hamauzu's use of motifs and repetition of melodies across different tracks for tying together a widely disparate collection of material, and called the mix of orchestral and electronic pieces as "incredible". He concluded that the work represents Hamauzu's "masterpiece", though some of the tracks do not fit well outside of the context of the scene in the game they represent. Don Kotowski of Square Enix Music Online similarly approved of the soundtrack, also highlighting the repetition of themes as well done. He particularly called out the variance of musical styles used in different tracks, from the "jazz fusion" of "Pulse de Chocobo" to the rock music of "Snow's Theme". The bonus drama CD was critiqued by Gann as "fun for bonus content" if the listener understood Japanese and as having high production values for a drama CD, but he noted that it did not add any real information to the story of the game.

Track list

 Literal translation of the original titles appear in (parenthesis) if different.

Soundtrack Plus

Final Fantasy XIII Original Soundtrack PLUS is a soundtrack album of Final Fantasy XIII, containing a selection of arrangements of musical tracks from the game. It was composed and produced by Masashi Hamauzu, and arranged by Hamauzu, Ryo Yamazaki, Mitsuto Suzuki, Toshiyuki Oomori, and Yoshihisa Hirano. The single-disc soundtrack contains 16 tracks, covering a duration of 50:10. It was released on May 26, 2010 in Japan by Square Enix, bearing the catalog number SQEX-10192. Only tracks 5, 9, and 15 are pieces actually used in the game but not included in the original album. The tracks in the album include pieces made for early previews of the game, modified versions of songs used in the international version of the game rather than the Japanese version that the original soundtrack album was based on, and early versions or arrangements of pieces that were not used in the game—for example, "Hope_PfNer3" uses a piano while Hamauzu ended up using a guitar for the final piece.

For the unused versions of songs included in this album, Hamauzu re-recorded and produced them to match the quality of the songs that were eventually used in the original soundtrack. The numbers following the "M" in the title of some pieces refer to the version number of the track, which Hamauzu used to keep track of changes made to pieces during their development, occasionally incrementing them by hundreds for major changes. Hamauzu came up with the idea for the album originally because he wanted to release the English version of "Pulse de Chocobo" as a downloadable song; when he started adding in promotional tracks and alternative-version tracks he found that he had enough material to release as a full album. Several of the alternate version tracks appeared in the game during specific scenes, or were cut towards the end of development. Hamauzu feels that the album represents how large of an undertaking the Final Fantasy XIII project was, in that even the outtakes were enough to fill an album.

The album reached #70 on the Oricon charts, and remained on the charts for two weeks. It received a lukewarm review from Patrick Gann of RPGFan, who said that while the music included was "beautiful" and a few specific tracks were "pretty cool", "anyone hoping for a proper arrangement of this music will be sorely disappointed". He claimed that there was not much difference between many of the alternate versions of songs and their final versions in the original soundtrack, which meant that in his opinion owners of the original soundtrack would not get much out of the "Plus" album. Jayson Napolitano of Original Sound Version gave a similar review for the album; he felt that while it included several interesting pieces that could not be found elsewhere, it was in his opinion more of a collector's item than a stand-alone album and likely not worth the cost for most listeners.

Piano Collections

Piano Collections Final Fantasy XIII is a soundtrack album of Final Fantasy XIII, containing a selection of piano arrangements of musical tracks from the game. It was composed and arranged by Masashi Hamauzu, and the pieces were performed by Aki Kuroda. Hamauzu and Kuroda had previously worked together when Hamauzu arranged the Final Fantasy X piano soundtrack album, and this previous collaboration made it easy for the two to work together. Hamauzu intended the arrangements to "stay away from recording the same music" on the piano. Though he noted that many of the tracks are similar to the originals, he wanted to "bring out subtle properties of the in-game melodies and making them more distinct", rather than greatly change the pieces. The single-disc soundtrack contains 10 tracks, covering a duration of 45:09. It was released on July 21, 2010 in Japan by Square Enix, bearing the catalog number SQEX-10196.

Chris Greening of Square Enix Music Online reviewed the album as "a sophisticated piano collection" that was enjoyable to listen to, though he noted that the arrangements were "straightforward" rather than ambitious. Jayson Napolitano of Original Sound Version gave a similar review for the album; he felt that it was an amazing album that, while not as technically difficult or different enough from the source material for some listeners, was still very beautiful and well-arranged. Gann of RPGFan, however, felt disappointed by the album, calling the arrangements "soul-less" and full of "needless grandiosity". He concluded that the original pieces were too rich and complex to translate well to solo piano arrangements, which left the works without substance as they did not deviate enough from the source material.

"Kimi ga Iru Kara"

 is the theme song of the Japanese version of Final Fantasy XIII. Sung by Sayuri Sugawara, it was composed by Masashi Hamauzu and had its lyrics written by Sugawara and Yukino Nakajima. The English version of the game used a song by Leona Lewis, "My Hands", which was not specially written for the game like the Japanese song. "Kimi ga Iru Kara" was released as a single on December 2, 2009 by For Life Music, and included in addition to the piece five other tracks. These tracks are "Eternal Love", another song written for Final Fantasy XIII, and "Christmas Again", a J-Pop song by Sugawara that incorporates some music from 19th-century composer Franz Liszt. The last three tracks are instrumental versions of these three songs. The single has a length of 30:04, and has the catalog number of FLCF-4311. A special edition of the single includes a bonus DVD, containing a seven-minute video of a compilation of promotional videos for the game.

"Kimi ga Iru Kara" reached #11 on the Japanese Oricon charts, and remained on the charts for 11 weeks. The single received generally unfavourable reviews from video game music critics. Gann of RPGFan called it "vanilla" and said that the single, especially the headline track, was over-produced and uninteresting. While he did not mind "Eternal Love" as much, he still felt that the CD was his least favorite Final Fantasy theme single. Square Enix Music Online had similar opinions of the release, calling it "bland". They felt that while "Kimi ga Iru Kara" was better than "My Hands", and "Eternal Love" better still, the single was disappointing both in the context of Final Fantasy singles and of Sugawara's previous discography.

Legacy
Final Fantasy XIII won the 2010 Soundtrack of the Year Golden Joystick Award. Music from Final Fantasy XIII was performed live in concert at the Distant Worlds II - More Music from Final Fantasy concert in Stockholm, Sweden by the Royal Stockholm Philharmonic Orchestra on June 12, 2010. The concert is part of the Distant Worlds concert series, the latest of several Final Fantasy concert series, and the tracks from Final Fantasy XIII, "The Promise" and "Fang's Theme", have been added to the series' permanent rotation. The official album for the concert does not include those two tracks. The full Piano Collections Final Fantasy XIII album was played at a concert in 2010: by Aki Kuroda in Osaka on October 29, and in Yokohama on September 3. Selections were played in a concert of Hamauzu's work in Paris on April 22, 2011.

A book of piano sheet music arrangements from the original soundtrack has been arranged for the piano and published by DOREMI Music Publishing. All songs in each book have been rewritten by Asako Niwa as beginning to intermediate level piano solos, though they are meant to sound as much like the originals as possible. The actual piano sheet music from the Final Fantasy XIII Piano Collection album has been published as a corresponding music book by Yamaha Music Media. Yamaha has additionally published its own sheet music book for piano arrangements from the original soundtrack, as well as a book of piano and vocal sheet music for the vocal tracks on the original soundtrack.

References

External links
 Official Square Enix Final Fantasy music site
 Masashi Hamauzu's official site
 Sayuri Sugawara's official site

Final Fantasy music
Video game soundtracks
Video game music discographies
Final Fantasy XIII

ja:君がいるから (菅原紗由理の曲)